Masodha is a town in the Faizabad district (now Ayodhya district) in the Indian state of Uttar Pradesh, India. It is a subpost office of Faizabad and is very close to the Faizabad city. Masodha is 6 km south of the district magistrate's office in Faizabad. Masodha is also a block in Faizabad district. 

There is sugar mill in Masodha.

Transport

Road 
Masodha is situated at Faizabad - Sultanpur Road NH 330 that is why Masodha is well connected with nearby cities and towns. Faizabad, Ayodhya, Sultanpur and Akbarpur are the nearby cities. Bhadarsa, Bikapur, Goshainganj, Mehbubganj, Maya Bazar, Sohawal, Raunahi, Tarun, Haiderganj are the nearby towns connected well with Masodha.

Railway 

Masodha is the main railway station which is located in Masodha town itself. Faizabad Junction, Bharatkund, Ayodhya Junction, Goshainganj, Rudauli and Chaure Bazar are the nearby railway stations from Masodha.

Air 
Ayodhya Airport (under construction) is the nearest airport to Masodha.

Demographics
 India census, Masodha had a population of 25,0. Males constitute 51% of the population and females 49%. Masodha has an average literacy rate of 62%, higher than the national average of 59.5%: male literacy is 71%, and female literacy is 52%. In Masodha, 17% of the population is under 6 years of age.

References 

Neighbourhoods in Faizabad
Industrial Area in Faizabad